On the Ocean EP is the sixth EP by the band Guster. The EP consists of alternate mixes and B-sides from their previous release, Easy Wonderful.

Track listing

References

External links
Official website

Guster albums
2011 EPs